Peter Benedik (born 21 November 1947 in Košice) is a retired football player and coach from Slovakia.

He has been involved in education of players as Peter Dubovský, Václav Němeček, Radek Bejbl, Pavel Nedvěd, Štefan Rusnák and others.

External links
 FK Dukla Banská Bystrica interview profile

References

1947 births
Living people
Slovak footballers
Slovak football managers
Slovak expatriate footballers
FK Dukla Banská Bystrica players
FK Dukla Banská Bystrica managers
Sportspeople from Košice
Association football midfielders
FC VSS Košice players